Mazur can refer to:

 Masurians or Mazurs, an ethnic group with historic origins in the Polish region of Masovia
 Mazur (surname), including a list of people so named
 Mazur (dance), a traditional Polish folk dance
 Mazur, Iran, a village in Markazi Province
 ORP Mazur, a Polish pre-war torpedo boat, the first warship lost in World War II

See also
 
 Masur (disambiguation)
 Mazor (disambiguation)
 Mazurek (disambiguation)
 Mazurski
 Mazyr, a city in Gomel Region of Belarus
 Mazyr District, Belarus